New Moorefield is an unincorporated community in Clark County, in the U.S. state of Ohio.

History
New Moorefield was first built up in the 1840s when a sawmill and gristmill were started there. A post office called New Moorefield was established in 1866, and remained in operation until 1926.

References

Unincorporated communities in Clark County, Ohio
1840s establishments in Ohio
Unincorporated communities in Ohio